Alan Bennion (18 April 1930 – 27 July 2018) was a British actor. He was best known for his work on the science fiction television series Doctor Who and the police drama Z-Cars. He made a total of five appearances on Z-Cars, and appeared in the Doctor Who serials The Seeds of Death, The Curse of Peladon and The Monster of Peladon, each time playing a different "Ice Lord".

He also appeared in a 1971 production of Hamlet with Sir Ian McKellen and Tim Pigott-Smith.

Filmography

References

External links

1930 births
2018 deaths
British male television actors
People from Northwich